Noreen Nash (born Norabelle Jean Roth; April 4, 1924) is an American former film and television actress. In the beginning of her career, she had uncredited parts at MGM. In 1945, she appeared in The Southerner, after which she had mostly leading roles in b-movies of the late 1940s and 1950s, such as The Red Stallion (1947), The Checkered Coat (1948), and Phantom from Space (1953). After retiring from acting in 1962, she attended university and became a writer, publishing several books.

Early life
Nash was born Norabelle Jean Roth on April 4, 1924, in Wenatchee, Washington. Her parents were Albert, who was in the beverage industry, and Gail Roth, a teacher. Gail died in 1998 at the age of 99.

Early Hollywood career
Nash's career started in 1942 when she was crowned ”Apple Blossom Queen” in her home town. With help from Louis Shurr, Bob Hope’s agent, she entered showbusiness and eventually got a contract with MGM as a showgirl. She had initially declined, since she had planned to attend Stanford University. She had previously tested for Warner Brothers, but wasn't signed. In 1942, she worked as a model alongside Marilyn Monroe. Her screen debut came in the 1943 musical film Girl Crazy, which starred Mickey Rooney and Judy Garland. Her MGM contract lapsed in 1944, having had mostly bit parts and appearing as a showgirl.

A 1945 newspaper article reported Nash being helped by actress Paulette Goddard. Goddard, the article said, was "sponsoring the career of shapely, brunette, blue-eyed and very beautiful Noreen Nash." The article added that her screen tests at Paramount Pictures were "arranged through the instigation of Paulette. As a result, Noreen was signed to a term contract.

Uncredited in her first movies, Nash eventually landed a role in director Jean Renoir's 1945 film The Southerner as farmer Henry's daughter Becky Devers. The film was nominated in three categories at the 18th Academy Awards in 1946. During this time, she changed her screen surname to Nash, inspired by her father in the film, J. Carroll Naish. She and Renoir remained friends for the rest of his life.

Leading roles in B-movies
In 1947, Nash started having significant roles in poverty row films. She played Judge Roger Tanner's daughter Sue in the Producers Releasing Corporation (PRC) low-budget street racing cautionary tale The Devil on Wheels, which starred Darryl Hickman. She and Terry Moore are believed to be the first actresses to wear bikini tops on screen. Later that year, she had one of the leading roles in The Big Fix (1947) as Ann Taylor, about gamblers trying to rig a basketball game. It featured Sheila Ryan and James Brown, and was director James Flood's penultimate film before his death in 1953. She was the leading lady in the Eagle-Lion Films Western Cinecolor film The Red Stallion (1947). She played horse trainer Ellen Reynolds, with Ted Donaldson and Robert Paige as the other top-billed actors.

Nash played the role of Linda in the 20th Century Fox Joe E. Brown drama The Tender Years (1948). It was set in the 19th century. She played Zanetta in the American-Mexican Eagle-Lion historical adventure film Adventures of Casanova (1948). It also featured Arturo de Córdova, Lucille Bremer, and Turhan Bey. She was cast as the leading lady in the Eagle-Lion film noir Assigned to Danger (1948), where she played criminal Nip's sister Bonnie Powers, opposite Gene Raymond. 

Although the film was described by writer Robert Nott as one of Budd Boetticher's worst, Nash considered him to be "the best director [she] ever worked with", praising the way he worked with the actors on set. She was the leading lady in the 20th Century Fox drama The Checkered Coat (1948), playing psychiatrist Dr. Michael Madden's (played by Tom Conway) wife Betty.

Nash played ranch owner Chris Marvin in the RKO Pictures Western Storm Over Wyoming (1950). The film also starred Tim Holt and Richard Martin. She worked with both of them a couple of years later in the same genre in Road Agent (1952). She played Cora Drew, daughter of rancher George Drew. She played scientist Barbara Randall in the 1953 independent science fiction Phantom from Space. One of her most noted films was one about a ranch owner, Giant (1956), in which she played the film star Lona Lane.

Television career
Some of the television series in which Nash appeared include Hopalong Cassidy, The Abbott and Costello Show and 77 Sunset Strip.

Post-acting career
Nash retired from acting in 1962, having been encouraged to do so by her youngest son. She attended UCLA, majoring in history, and graduated with a Bachelor's degree in 1971. She published the novel By Love Fulfilled in 1980, which was about a doctor in the 16th century. It was partly based on the Flemish anatomist and physician Vesalius. In 2013, she published another book, titled Agnes Sorèl, Mistress of Beauty. In 2015, she and Jeanne Rejaunier published Titans of The Muses: When Henry Miller Met Jean Renoir; she had worked with Renoir on The Southerner, and she was also friends with the American novelist Henry Miller.

Personal life
Nash married Dr. Lee Siegel on December 12, 1942, in Las Vegas, after only having known each other for little over a month. They had two sons, Lee Siegel Jr., a novelist and religion professor, and Robert James Siegel, a cardiologist. Dr. Siegel worked as a medical director at the film studio 20th Century Fox, died on May 7, 1990. In 2001, she married actor James Whitmore, who died in 2009.

Nash's brother Albert was married to actress Susan Hart's sister. According to Hart, it was Nash's beauty that inspired her to become an actress as well. She supported the campaign of Democrat Adlai Stevenson during the 1952 presidential election.

Filmography

Television credits

Works
By Love Fulfilled (1980)
Agnès Sorel, Mistress of Beauty (2013)
The Paris Diet (2015)
Titans of the Muses: When Henry Miller Met Jean Renoir (2015)

References

External links

1924 births
Living people
American film actresses
American television actresses
People from Wenatchee, Washington
Metro-Goldwyn-Mayer contract players
20th-century American actresses
California Democrats
Washington (state) Democrats
Paramount Pictures contract players
American writers
21st-century American women